Lee Chong-Hi is a female former international table tennis player from South Korea.

Table tennis career
She won a silver medal at the 1959 World Table Tennis Championships, in the Corbillon Cup (women's team event) for South Korea with Cho Kyung-Cha, Choi Kyung-ja and Hwang Yool-ja.   She also made the women's doubles quarter final during the same championships.

See also
 List of World Table Tennis Championships medalists

References

South Korean female table tennis players
Year of birth missing (living people)
living people
World Table Tennis Championships medalists
20th-century South Korean women